Colonel (Res.) Adv. Daniel Reisner (born in Israel in 1963) is the former Head of the International Law Branch of the Israel Defense Forces (IDF) Legal Division, and a partner with Herzog, Fox & Neeman.

References

External links
Herzog, Fox & Neeman bio
Martindale-Hubbell bio

Tel Aviv University alumni
Academic staff of Tel Aviv University
Israeli lawyers
Living people
1963 births
Date of birth missing (living people)